Zawgyi is a semi-immortal human alchemist and mystic with supernatural powers and often seen with a magic stick and a red hat. Zawgyi is one of the supernatural figures in Burmese mythology and folklore.

Legend and powers

Zawgyi has supernatural powers such as flying through the air, travelling beneath the earth and oceans, as well as performing divination, necromancy and resurrection. He dwells alone in Himavanta, an invisible mythical forest set deep in the Himalaya Mountains, where he forages herbs for magical purposes. After searching for many years he obtained the mythical Philosopher's stone and thereby gained Zawgyihood.

Sometimes, with a touch of his magic wand he brings to life "illusory females" (Thuyaung-mèý) from Nariphon (Thuyaung fruit trees) bearing female-shaped fruits in order fulfill his carnal wishes. He gained it by medicines derived from trees, roots, tubers and bulb of deep forests and legendary ball of mercury which possesses supernatural powers. They spend their lives searching for herbs to treat suffering humans and to attain longevity. They use the magic wand to grind the medicinal herbs and roots and any round flat stone found miles from anywhere are believed to be the Zawgyi's grinding stones. He always has a staff in his hand, which he would use during his walks especially in negotiating along very rugged footpaths.

Zawgyi practices alchemy to become Weizza and attain immortal life, along with lesser attainments such as supranormal powers. The goal of this practice is to achieve the timeless state of the Weizza, who awaits the appearance of the future Buddha, Metteya.

Costume
Zawgyi are dressed in red from head to toe with a red hat and a magic wand in hand. There are only male Zawgyis. Mustache is an optional part of the costume.
Zawgyi becomes a Weizza (Master Wizard, technically super Zawgyi), he would change his dress to white and would change his trousers for a white Burmese longyi.

Zawgyi dance and choreography
Zawgyi dance is basically a happy dance to portray how he grinds medicines with the wand and how he finally created a magic pill. Therefore, nearing to the end of the performance, he performs this choreography where he holds the wand horizontally and jumps across it to show his success.

References

Bibliography
 
 

Buddhist folklore
Burmese folklore
Fictional Burmese people